Sahakevo is a commune located in the Atsinanana region of eastern Madagascar.  It belongs to the Marolambo District.

The commune is situated in a remote area of Madagascar.

References

Populated places in Atsinanana